Paul Rayner (born 1959) is an English-New Zealand ceramicist known for his work creating pop culture figures in the tradition of Toby jugs and Staffordshire figurines.

Born in Luton, England, Rayner moved to New Zealand as a teenager. After working at the Sarjeant Gallery in Whanganui, he developed an interest in art.  Rayner did a Bachelor of Fine Arts focused on painting at the University of Auckland before working in New Zealand museums and art galleries while developing his ceramics.

After leaving the Sarjeant Gallery in 2006, Paul has run a gallery and often collaborates with, his brother Mark Rayner.

Works 
Ken & Ken (the Topp Twins) 2011 is held by Te Papa
Caring is our strength; 'The lover of swans'  was poster for the Gay Hero Art Exhibition 1992 
Carmen 2004, is held by the Dowse Art Museum

Exhibitions 
2008 ID Me, Suter Gallery, Nelson
2008 Magic of Mud, Dowse Art Museum, Lower Hutt
2004 House of Dowse, Dowse Art Museum, Lower Hutt
2001 Wanganui Artists, Parliament Buildings, Wellington
2000 Keep off the Grass, Pataka Museum, Porirua

References

University of Auckland alumni
New Zealand curators
New Zealand ceramicists
People from Luton
Artists from Whanganui
English emigrants to New Zealand
1959 births
Living people
Date of birth missing (living people)